
The following is a list of Playboy Playmates of 1972.  Playboy magazine names their Playmate of the Month each month throughout the year.

January

Marilyn Cole (born 7 May 1949, Portsmouth, England) is Playboy magazine's January 1972 Playmate of the Month, as well as their 1973 Playmate of the Year, the only Briton to hold that title.  Her original pictorial was photographed by Alexas Urba.

February

P.J. Lansing (born October 13, 1949, in Frankford, Missouri) is an American model.  She was Playboys Playmate of the Month for its February 1972 issue. Her centerfold was photographed by Pompeo Posar.

March

Ellen Michaels (born February 12, 1953, in Queens) is an American model and photographer.

She was Playboy magazine's Playmate of the Month for the March 1972 issue. Her centerfold was photographed by Dwight Hooker.

Michaels, who was getting a degree in elementary education at the time of her pictorial, went on to become a successful model for everything from advertising campaigns to romance novels. She appears on many record album covers including The Salsoul Orchestra, Eric Clapton, and Barrabas.

She also has donated much of her time to charity work with the disabled and senior citizens, and ran a volunteer program for the blind for many years.

She is currently a wildlife and nature photographer, specializing in photos of the birds, butterflies, insects and landscapes of Central Park in New York City.

April

Vicki Peters (born September 9, 1950, in Minneapolis) is an American model and actress. She was Playboy magazine's Playmate of the Month for its April 1972 issue. Her centerfold was photographed by Mario Casilli. In 1970, Peters appeared in the film Blood Mania.

May

Deanna Baker (born December 29, 1949, in St. Louis) is an American model. She was chosen by Playboy magazine to be its Playmate of the Month for May 1972. She was also a Playboy Bunny at the Denver club.

June

Debbie Davis (born September 9, 1951, in Pittsburgh) is an American model. She was Playboy magazine's Playmate of the Month for June 1972. Her centerfold was photographed by William Figge.

July

Carol O'Neal (born August 18, 1948, in New York City) is an American model. She is best known as Playboy magazine's Playmate of the Month for its July 1972 issue. Her centerfold was photographed by Richard Fegley. O'Neal had a small part in the 1979 film When a Stranger Calls.  She was later married to former NFL Quarterback Bobby Douglass.

August

Linda Summers (born November 20, 1950, in San Diego) is an American model. She was Playboy magazine's Playmate of the Month for the August 1972 issue. Her centerfold was photographed by William Figge and Ed DeLong.

September

Susan Miller (born March 22, 1947, in New York City) is an American model and actress. She was Playboy magazine's Playmate of the Month for the September 1972 issue. Her centerfold was photographed by Mario Casilli.

October

Sharon Johansen (born October 11, 1948) is a Norwegian-American model and actress.  She was Playboy magazine's Playmate of the Month for its October 1972 issue. Her centerfold was photographed by Alexas Urba. Johansen was born in Norway, but when she was a year old her family moved to Wisconsin.

For a brief time, Johansen worked as a receptionist for Pierre Salinger. She posed nude for the December 1979 Playboy pictorial "Playmates Forever!"

November

Lena Forsén (born March 31, 1951, in Sweden; appeared as a Playmate in the November 1972 issue of Playboy magazine, under the name Lenna Sjööblom. Her centerfold was photographed by Dwight Hooker.

Her photo (known as Lenna) is often used in the field of digital image processing.

December

Mercy Rooney (born Merci Montello on June 21, 1950, in New Jersey) is an American model and actress.  She was the December 1972 Playmate of the Month. Her centerfold was photographed by Alexas Urba. In March 1973 she was the Playmate of the Month in the German edition of Playboy and simultaneously appeared on the covers of the U.S., German, French and Italian editions. She was also a Playboy Bunny at the Los Angeles club.

See also
 List of people in Playboy 1970–1979

References

1972-related lists
1972
Playmates Of 1972